Sol da Justiça is the fourteenth album in the live praise and worship series of contemporary worship music by Diante do Trono.

About the project 
In the pre-recording of the Sol da Justiça, the mining group released Aleluia, recorded at the Cowboy Park Barretos, in Barretos.

The album was recorded in Natal. On the disc, the group manages to bring a new musical influence in his music, being different from Aleluia, its predecessor. The orchestra band was absent in the work.

The work was also responsible for making the group receiving his first Latin Grammy nomination in the category Best Portuguese Language Christian Album in 2012. Also received several nominations Trophy Promises.

On 16 July 2011, with an estimated 120,000 people in Beach of Meio public recording of the album was made. But by heavy rains leading up to that day, the recording was impaired by time. So to solve the problem, two days after the group recorded the album again, but in the Riachuelo Theatre, also in Natal. The recording was attended by Asaph Borba and former members of the group, who participated in a medley singing the older songs the group.

A few days after the release, the group also released an application for smartphones, tablets and iPods.

On 21 September, the Expocristã, the disc had sold over forty thousand copies in Brazil, and had been released two days earlier.

The album has a more pop rock sound, different from previous works. The album also features some international versions.

Track listing

CD

DVD

References 

2011 live albums
2011 video albums
Live video albums
Portuguese-language live albums
Diante do Trono video albums
Diante do Trono live albums